Cornelis de Baellieur (1607, Antwerp – 1671, Antwerp), was a Flemish Baroque painter.

Biography
According to the RKD he was a pupil of Anthonis Liesaert and is known for paintings of art galleries such as Interior of an Art Gallery. He became a master in the Antwerp Guild of St. Luke in 1626. He drew figures in the paintings of other painters, such as Hans III Jordaens.

References

Cornelis de Baellieur on Artnet

1607 births
1671 deaths
Flemish Baroque painters
Artists from Antwerp